Refractory anemia with ring sideroblasts  is a type of myelodysplastic syndrome. RARS is characterized by 5% or less myeloblasts in bone marrow. RARS is distinguished from refractory anemia by having 15% or more ringed sideroblasts among the erythroid precursors in the bone marrow.

References

External links 

Myeloid neoplasia